A.E. Poseidon P.P.P., known as Poseidon Neon Poron, is a Greek football club based in Neoi Poroi, Pieria, Greece. Its colours are blue and white. The home games of the team take place at the Neoi Poroi Stadium.

History
The Athletic Association of Poros "Poseidon" was founded in 1979. After mergers with the associations of neighboring settlements Thermaikos Platamonas in 1987 and AE Kastro Neos Panteleimonas in 1993 they were renamed to Athletic Association of Poros - Platamonas - Panteleimon "Poseidon".

The most important success of the club was the conquest of the championship of the Gamma Ethniki in the period 2002–03. Also, noteworthy is their participation in the championship of the Beta Ethniki in the seasons 2003–04 where they finished 5th and 2004–05 when they were eliminated.

Honours

Leagues 
Gamma Ethniki (Third National Division)
 Winners (1): 2002–03'''

References

External links
 FCA Pieria official website

Football clubs in Greece
Association football clubs established in 1993
1993 establishments in Greece
Gamma Ethniki clubs